Ellen Winther Lembourn (née Sørensen; 11 August 1933, Århus – 13 August 2011) was a Danish opera singer, best known internationally for her participation in the 1962 Eurovision Song Contest.

Winther trained as an opera singer and made her professional debut in 1957 at the Royal Danish Theatre, where she would be employed for 30 years both as a singer and a dramatic actress. In 1962, Winther won the Danish Eurovision Song Contest selection with the song "Vuggevise" ("Lullaby"), and went forward to the seventh Eurovision Song Contest, held in Luxembourg City on 18 March. "Vuggevise" finished in joint 10th place out of 16 entries.

Winther became well known to Danish audiences by many appearances in film and television, as well as singing in opera, stage musicals and revues. In 1983, she was awarded the Order of the Dannebrog for her contribution to the arts in Denmark.

Marriages
Winther was married to pianist John Winther from 1960-66, with two children from this marriage, and to writer and politician Hans Jørgen Lembourn from 1973 until his death in 1997.

Death
Ellen Winther Lembourn died on 13 August 2011, two days after her 78th birthday.

References

1933 births
2011 deaths
Eurovision Song Contest entrants for Denmark
Danish women singers
Danish opera singers
Eurovision Song Contest entrants of 1962
People from Aarhus